Chinatown Connection was a martial arts action film directed by Jean-Paul Ouellette released on June 1, 1990. It stars Bruce Ly, Lee Majors II, Art Camacho, Brinke Stevens and Fitz Houston. Two police officers lead a team to stop poison laced narcotics from getting on the streets.

Story
The film stars Bruce Ly as Lieutenant John Chan and Lee Majors II as Detective Warren Houston. 
John has the job of reforming violent police officers. He has to team up with a cop Houston who is somewhat trigger happy. For a reason that defies explanation, drug dealers are selling poisoned cocaine. They have to work together to find the source of cocaine that has been laced with cyanide. Their quest takes them to where the evidence points to, a secret organization which is called The Taipan. They are faced with the task of taking this organization on. Tony North who is the #1 man of the cartel boss is the man responsible for the drugs being poisoned. Along with their heavily armed assault team, they bring down the powerful organization that was behind the narcotics being sold.

Info on the film
One of the executives in the production company for the film, Esseff/Arpaia Productions was involved with a company that made and sold mozzarella cheese. The bundles of cheese were used as stand ins for the packages of drugs. This was their second film, the first being the sci-fi film, R.O.T.O.R..

Releases
It was released on VHS by South-gate Entertainment in 1990.
The DVD version was released in Australia through Flashback Entertainment in or around 2000.

Reviews
The Synopsis by Filmaffinity mentioned that the plot was thin it had decent martial arts action and gun fights, also mentioning the church shootout and the finale as well done action sequences. The review given by Fist of B-List was a low one and recommended it only for Art Camacho completists and those who like the East-meets-West reluctant partner dynamic. It noted Fitz Houston's performance in the film and referred to him as a cross between Predator-era Carl Weathers with muscles and great polo shirts and Norman Smiley, a former pro-wrestler. Comeuppance Reviews said that in spite of the amateurish qualities, there was a lot to like about the movie. It was ideal for action fans who don't take themselves too seriously.

Cast (listed alphabetically)
 Art Camacho as Estes 
 Susan Frailey as Dawson
 William Ghent as Hong 
 Paul Gunning as Mike
 Fitz Houston as Tony North
 John M. Jackson as P.C. Pete  
 Bruce Ly as John Chan
 Pat McCormick as Flynn 
 Lee Majors II as Detective Warren Houston
 Scott Richards
 Brinke Stevens as Missy

Crew
 Director ... Jean-Paul Ouellette
 Editing ... Skip Williams, Karen D. Joseph (associate editor) 
 Music ... Chris Caswell 
 Producer ... Michael Emerson
 Screenwriter ... Joseph Berry
 Sound ... Itzhak Magal
 Sound recording engineer ... Itzhak Magal

Production and distribution etc
 Production Co ...   Bcd Productions, Esseff / Arpaia Productions
The film was released in theaters on June 1, 1990, and made it on DVD on Jul 26, 1990.

References

External links
 Imdb: Chinatown Connection
 Russian Picture of Russian release
 Trailer

Reviews
 Comeuppance Reviews: Chinatown Connection

American martial arts films
Films about drugs
1989 action films
1989 films
1989 martial arts films
American police detective films
1980s English-language films
1980s American films